Nidhal Aissa (born 8 June 1991) is a Qatari handball player for Al-Wakrah and the Qatari national team.

He represented Qatar at the 2019 World Men's Handball Championship.

References

1991 births
Living people
Qatari male handball players